Jeremy Sparks (born May 31, 1977) is an American, a retired Professional Rodeo Cowboy Association member, Cheyenne Frontier Days Rodeo Hall of Fame  Bullfighter, and author of Go West - 10 Principles that Guided My Cowboy Journey.

Early life

Sparks was born in Helena, Arkansas to Elmer and Claudie Sparks. He has two brothers, Jeff and Jay Sparks. In 1989, his family moved from Marvell, Arkansas to Fountain Hill, Arkansas. It was there he had a God-given dream to pursue rodeo bullfighting. While only 14 years old, he dedicated himself to pursuing the sport and was mentored by champion bullfighter Donny Sparks. Two months after graduating from Fountain Hill High, Jeremy was electrocuted in a farm related accident and his rodeo plans were temporarily derailed. While originally planning to attend McNeese State University on a rodeo scholarship, the accident forced him to withdrawal and instead enroll at the University of Central Arkansas in Conway. Sparks pledged Pi Kappa Alpha in the Spring 1996 semester. After three years recovering from the electrocution, Jeremy returned to rodeo. Sparks joined the University of Arkansas-Monticello rodeo team where he completed in the team roping and tie down roping events of the National Intercollegiate Rodeo Association. In addition, he served as a bullfighter at amateur and collegiate events as he trained under World Champion Bullfighter Mike Matt.

Career

In September 2000, while still a student at UAM, Jeremy earned his membership to the Professional Rodeo Cowboys Association. In May 2001, he graduated magna cum laude with a degree in communications. After the terrorist attacks on 9/11, Jeremy enlisted in the Air Force and went on to earn his commission in December 2001. In March 2002 he was invited by the South Korean Minister of Tourism to perform an exhibition bullfight at the famed Cheongdo International Bullfighting Festival in Cheongdo, South Korea. Soon after his return, he was contracted by the Cheyenne Frontier Days Rodeo to fight bulls at the 2002 event on Military Appreciation Day. He went on to establish a legacy at CFD, working the rodeo nine times and being enshrined in the Class of 2013 CFD Hall of Fame.

He is a 5-time bullfighter for the College National Finals Rodeo  in Casper, Wyoming and worked PRCA Circuit Final Rodeos  on both the East and West Coasts.

During his career, he was appointed Case 05-195 and represented the United States Air Force  as the only professional bullfighter endorsed by the Pentagon  in the history of the USAF. He was a Wrangler endorsee, the face of Bresnan Communications, and featured by Mutual of Omaha in the 2010 Aha Moment TV commercial campaign.

In 2008, he appeared on Pressure Cook with Chef Ralph Pagano and later on the Power of 10 with Drew Carey.

Jeremy retired from professional rodeo in 2010.

In 2016, Jeremy contracted with Elevate Publishing to publish his story, Go West and authentically shares the 10 lessons that he learned in route to a hall of fame career.

Personal life

Jeremy is married to Jamie Jordan. He is the father of three boys, including a set of twins. Currently he works for a Fortune100 company in Organizational Change Management.

References 

 http://www.thefencepost.com/article/20100810/NEWS/100809927
 http://www.denverpost.com/2006/11/26/airman-does-double-duty-as-bullfighter/
 http://www.jeremysparks.com/
 https://www.youtube.com/watch?v=HdR-R-6VW3c
 http://trib.com/sports/college/cnfr-tuesday-sparks-leads-duel-life-that-air-force-enjoys/article_921e6c73-2fb7-50d6-a6a9-355cb3ce041f.html
 www.arirang.co.kr/Tv/Korea_A_Pop.asp?PROG_CODE=TVCR0109

Living people
1977 births
People from Helena, Arkansas
Cowboys
People from Ashley County, Arkansas
Rodeo clowns